Ciosna  (German: Dorotheenhof) is a settlement in the administrative district of Gmina Gryfino, within Gryfino County, West Pomeranian Voivodeship, in north-western Poland, close to the German border.

See also
History of Pomerania.

References

Ciosna